Outbreak of Love is a 1981 Australian miniseries about Melbourne society just before World War I.

References

External links
Outbreak of Love at IMDb
Outbreak of Love at AustLit

World War I television drama series
English-language television shows
1980s Australian television miniseries
1981 Australian television series debuts
1981 Australian television series endings